12x12 may refer to:

 Twelve wheel drive (12x12), a vehicle configuration with 12 wheels, all of them drive wheels
 Twelve Steps and Twelve Traditions a book published by Alcoholics Anonymous World Services
 12"x12 New Order Vinyl Campaign, a series of 12 12-inch single gramophone records
 12x12 Original Remixes Talk Talk